Linda Sutton (born 1947) is a British painter. She was born in Southend-on-Sea, Essex. She studied at Winchester School of Art and the Royal College of Art in London, graduating in 1974.

She is a regular exhibitor at the Royal Academy Summer Exhibition.

Collections 
Sutton paintings are in art collections throughout the world. These include:
Queen Fabiola of Belgium
Royal Academy of Arts
Sainsbury Collection
Alexander Thynn, 7th Marquess of Bath (Longleat House)
Ian & Cynthia Short Collection

References

External links
Artist's website

1947 births
Living people
20th-century English painters
21st-century English painters
20th-century English women artists
21st-century English women artists
Alumni of the Royal College of Art
Alumni of the University of Southampton
English women painters
People from Southend-on-Sea